Paleacrita is a genus of moths in the family Geometridae first described by Riley in 1876.

Species
Paleacrita longiciliata Hulst, 1898
Paleacrita merriccata Dyar, 1903
Paleacrita vernata (Peck, 1795)

References

Bistonini